Comeby is a ghost town in Rankin County, Mississippi, United States.

Comeby was a sawmill town, and was named for the favorite expression of the mill owner, John R. Webster: "come by to see me".

Comeby had a post office from 1903 to 1918, and was a stop on the Illinois Central Railroad.

References

Former populated places in Rankin County, Mississippi
Former populated places in Mississippi